Communist Left Youth (in Spanish: Juventudes de Izquierda Comunista, in Catalan: Joventuts d'Esquerra Comunista) was a Spanish youth organization. It was the youth wing of the Organization of Communist Left (OIC), which in 1979 merged into the Communist Movement (MC). JIC was legally registered with the Interior Ministry (as a political party) on October 31, 1977.

References

 Joel Sans Molas: L'Organització D'Esquerra Comunista En El Moviment Obrer: Les Plataformes I Comisions Obreres Anticapitalistes (1971-1977). Universitat Autònoma de Barcelona, Barcelona, 2015.

Youth wings of political parties in Spain
Youth wings of communist parties